Action Medical Research, previously The National Fund for Research into Crippling Diseases, is a British medical research charity, founded in 1952, that focusses on funding research to prevent and treat disease and disability in babies and children.

Action Medical Research (Registered Charity No. 208701) is based in Horsham, West Sussex. Prince Philip, Duke of Edinburgh is their patron; their president is Charles Guthrie, Baron Guthrie of Craigiebank. Paddington Bear has been the charity's mascot since 1976.

History
Founded in 1952 as the National Fund for Poliomyelitis Research by Duncan Guthrie, the charity's original aim was the eradication of polio. During the 1940s and 1950s, epidemics of paralytic poliomyelitis were frequent in the UK, and the charity helped to fund the first British polio vaccine. After the steep reduction in paralytic poliomyelitis resulting from the introduction of the vaccine, the charity's activities diversified. It became The National Fund for Research into Poliomyelitis and Other Crippling Diseases in 1960 and The National Fund for Research into Crippling Diseases in 1967, becoming known informally as Action Research for the Crippled Child. It was renamed Action Research in 1990, and became Action Medical Research in 2003. The World Health Organization's 2002 declaration that Europe is free from polio coincided with the charity's fiftieth anniversary.

Projects
Their major focus has been on pregnancy and conditions affecting babies, with involvement in projects including the rubella vaccine, ultrasound scanning in pregnancy, intrauterine blood typing, folic acid in the prevention of spina bifida, and the diagnosis of retinopathy in premature babies. Projects in older children include diet in liver disease and treatment of burns in children. Other projects include treatment for epilepsy. The charity has also been involved in hip replacement surgery and the development of aids for the elderly and severely disabled, including communication aids, the shapeable 'matrix' wheelchair and the 'Tools for Living' programme. The charity has also funded research into osteoporosis, nerve repair, hydrocephalus and myasthenia gravis.

Their current appeal 'Touching Tiny Lives' is raising money for research to prevent premature births, and pre-eclampsia and other life-threatening complications of pregnancy. It also aims to improve treatments for babies requiring special care. Supported by celebrities including Tony Hadley and Martin Fry, the campaign had raised almost £4 million by March 2009. Action Medical Research is also involved in lobbying the UK government to increase funding for research in these areas, which has led to an early day motion from Stewart Jackson, MP, signed by a total of 69 MPs.

Fundraising activities
The charity has organised an annual, 100-mile, sponsored cycle ride since 1982; five hundred cyclists participated in the 2007 event. They also organise an annual London-to-Paris sponsored cycle ride, timed to coincide with the Tour de France, as well as numerous local sports events. The annual 'Bring Your Bear' event celebrates mascot Paddington Bear's birthday on 25 June, with over five hundred schools and children's groups participating in 2007; 'Bring Your Bear' is supported by television personality, Zoë Ball. The charity publishes a supporters' magazine, Touching Lives, with issues from 2002 available online.

References

External links
Action Medical Research

Health charities in the United Kingdom